Keta is one of the constituencies represented in the Parliament of Ghana. It elects one Member of Parliament (MP) by the first past the post system of election. Keta is located in the Keta district of the Volta Region of Ghana.

Boundaries
The seat is one of two constituencies located within the Keta district of the Volta Region of Ghana. The other is the Anlo constituency.

Members of Parliament

Elections

 
 
 

 
 

 
 
 
 
 

 
 

 
 
 
 
 
 

 
 

 
 
 
 

 
 

 
 
 
 
 
 
 
 
 
 

Dan Abodakpi, MP for Keta constituency, who was also Minister for Trade and Industry in the NDC Rawlings government, was jailed by a Fast Track Court in Ghana for fraud.

See also
List of Ghana Parliament constituencies

References 

Adam Carr's Election Archives
2004 results on Ghana Home Page

Parliamentary constituencies in the Volta Region